Mesbahuddin Ahmed was a Bangladeshi educationalist and geologist.

Early life
Ahmed was born on 8 September 1920 in Dibrugarh, Assam, British India. In 1941, he graduated from High School. He received a B.Sc degree in Geology from the Presidency University, Kolkata in 1943. He completed his Masters in Geology from the Presidency University, Kolkata in 1945. In 1948, he completed a Masters in Economics from Columbia University.

Career
Ahmed served in the Geological Survey of Pakistan. After the Bangladesh Liberation war and the Independence of Bangladesh, he joined the Geological Survey of Bangladesh. He reached the position of the Geological Survey of Bangladesh. He served as the head of the Planning and Implementation cell in the Ministry of Power, Energy and Mineral Resources. In 1982, he retired from government service and joined the private sector as a consultant. He was as a consultant in the 2nd Gas Development Project of the World Bank in Bangladesh. He worked at the National Oceanographic And Maritime Institute. He was the founding Vice-President of Bangladesh Geological Society. He served two terms as the President of Bangladesh Geological Society.

Death
Ahmed died on 28 September 2002 in Dhaka, Bangladesh.

References

1920 births
2002 deaths
Bangladeshi geologists
Pakistani geologists
People from Dibrugarh district
20th-century geologists